Turkmenistan is a sovereign country in Central Asiabordered by Kazakhstan to the northwest, Uzbekistan to the north and east, Afghanistan to the southeast, Iran to the south and southwest and the Caspian Sea to the west.

Notable firms 
This list includes notable companies with primary headquarters located in the country. The industry and sector follow the Industry Classification Benchmark taxonomy. Organizations which have ceased operations are included and noted as defunct.

References 

Turkmenistan
Turkmenistan-related lists